Stilla jul is a 1991 Christmas album by Åsa Jinder.

Track listing
Jul, jul, strålande jul (Gustaf Nordqvist, Edvard Evers)
Bereden väg för Herran (Frans Michael Franzén)
Stilla natt (Stille Nacht, heilige Nacht) (Franz Gruber)
Nu tändas tusen juleljus (Emmy Köhler)
Julfrid och glädje (Åsa Jinder)
När det lider mot jul (Det strålar en stjärna) (Ruben Liljefors)
Ett barn är fött (trad., arr. Lennart Sjöholm)
Betlehems stjärna (Alice Tegnér)
Away in a Manger (William J. Kirkpatrick)
Santa Lucia (Teodoro Cottrau)
Vem är det barnet (trad., arr. Lennart Sjöholm)
Härlig är jorden (Schönster Herr Jesu) (trad., arr. Lennart Sjöholm)

Track listing
Åsa Jinder, nyckelharpa
Katarina Johansson, oboe
Benny Johansson, clarinet
Magnus Lind, accordion
Peter Ljung, piano

References 

1991 Christmas albums
Christmas albums by Swedish artists
Folk Christmas albums
Åsa Jinder albums